Ethmia quadrillella is a moth belonging to the family Depressariidae, subfamily Ethmiinae.

Subspecies
Three subspecies have been described:
 Ethmia quadrillella quadrillela – northern populations
 Ethmia quadrillella canuisella (Millière, 1867) – southwestern populations (southern France, Italy)
 Ethmia quadrillella luctuosella (Herrich-Schäffer, 1854) – Asia Minor

Distribution
This species can be found in Eurasia.

Habitat
This species mainly inhabits unmanaged meadows, hedge rows  and rough grasslands.

Description
The basic color of wings is white, with large black markings.

Biology
The flight time ranges from May to mid September in one or two generations. The host plants are comfrey (genus Symphytum), forget-me-not (genus Myosotis)  and lungwort (Pulmonaria officinalis). Larvae overwinter in a cocoon amongst leaf litter.

Gallery

References

External links
 
 
 Ethmia quadrillella - Biodiversity Heritage Library - Bibliografia
 Ethmia quadrillella - NCBI Taxonomy Database
 Ethmia quadrillella - Global Biodiversity Information Facility
 Ethmia quadrillella - Encyclopedia of Life

quadrillella
Moths of Europe
Insects of Turkey
Moths described in 1783